mpg123 is a free and open-source audio player. It supports MPEG audio formats, including MP3.

As a console application, it has no graphical user interface.

mpg123's Assembly code is optimized with SIMD instructions to improve the performance of the iDCT part of the MPEG decoding.

mpg123's decoding library, libmpg123 is used by DeaDBeeF, Audacious, XMMS and Winamp (version 5.8) for MP3 playback and can be used in Winamp before version 5.8 via a plugin.

History 
The license for the last release (0.59r / 19 June 1999) from the original authors included restrictive (non-commercial, no-derivative) terms, although the source code was available. This led to the creation of mpg321, a similar program (based on MAD) licensed under the GPLv2. 

Official development of mpg123 and its library mpglib stalled, and serious security holes emerged. Patches were applied downstream for packages provided by various Linux and BSD operating systems.

In 2006, a new maintainer started work towards the release of a new official mpg123 package. After several security rollup releases in the 0.6.x series, version 1.0 was released in 2007 under the LGPLv2.1, with libmpg123 as a replacement for mpglib.

See also 

Comparison of audio player software
ogg123 (A similar program that plays Ogg Vorbis files. Released with the vorbis-tools reference software.)
madplay

References

External links

Free audio software
Audio player software for Linux
Free media players
Linux media players
Free software primarily written in assembly language
Free software programmed in C
C (programming language) libraries